La Mesilla is a village in La Democracia municipality, Huehuetenango Department,  Guatemala. It is the home of Peñarol La Mesilla football club. 

La Mesilla lies close to the border with Mexico, between Huehuetenango city and Comitán, Mexico.

External links
Map of the La Mesilla area at Maplandia

Guatemala–Mexico border crossings
Populated places in Guatemala